Ross Geldenhuys (born 19 April 1983) is a South African rugby union footballer.

He was initially named in the  squad for the 2013 Super Rugby season, but was later released to the 2013 Vodacom Cup squad.

In 2018 he made his debut for the Sharks and was signed to play for the Hurricanes in NZ the next year. After a stunning provincial season with the Bay of Plenty he was picked for the Chief's 2020 wider squad and made his debut against the Crusaders in week 3 and was on the bench the following 2 weeks.

References

External links

itsrugby.co.uk profile

Living people
1983 births
South African rugby union players
South African expatriate rugby union players
Rugby union props
Golden Lions players
Lions (United Rugby Championship) players
Free State Cheetahs players
Border Bulldogs players
Boland Cavaliers players
Griffons (rugby union) players
Afrikaner people
South African people of Dutch descent
Rugby union players from Cape Town
Tasman rugby union players
Highlanders (rugby union) players
South African expatriate sportspeople in New Zealand
Expatriate rugby union players in New Zealand
Alumni of St. Andrew's College, Grahamstown
Southern Kings players
Pumas (Currie Cup) players
Eastern Province Elephants players
Sharks (Currie Cup) players
Sharks (rugby union) players
Bay of Plenty rugby union players
Hurricanes (rugby union) players
Chiefs (rugby union) players